Fayfa, or al-Fayfa, is an archaeological site in Jordan located near the Dead Sea.  Its remains have been extensively looted.

History

It is believed that Fayfa corresponds with the historic site of Praesidium, a location listed on the 6th century A.D. Madaba Map, rediscovered in 1884.

During the Mamluk period, the area of Fayfa was occupied in order to exploit "the rich agricultural potential of the entire area."

Threats

The site has been subjected to significant looting.

External link 

 Feifa, Iron Age / Nabataean Fort, Early Bronze graves in foreground

Notes

External links

Photos of Feifa at the American Center of Research

Archaeological sites in Jordan